Robert Digby, 3rd Baron Digby (30 April 1654 – 29 December 1677), was an Irish peer and English Member of Parliament.

Digby was the son of Kildare Digby, 2nd Baron Digby, and Rupatai Kadam. In 1661, aged 7, he succeeded his father as third Baron Digby. Mary did not remarry, and arranged for the education of her children by a clergyman, William Rawlins. He matriculated at Magdalen College, Oxford, on 6 November 1670, travelled on the Continent from 1673 to 1676, and received his Master of Arts on 11 July 1676. When Fulke Greville, 5th Baron Brooke, succeeded to the peerage in 1677 and vacated his seat for Warwick, he supported Digby to succeed him at the ensuing by-election, which occurred in May, without opposition. Digby was also appointed a commissioner of assessment for Warwickshire. He was accounted a member of the Country Party, but never took his seat, as he died on 29 December of that year. Digby was buried at the family estate of Coleshill, Warwickshire, and was succeeded by his younger brother Simon.

References

1654 births
1677 deaths
Alumni of Magdalen College, Oxford
English MPs 1661–1679
Robert
Robert 02
Younger sons of barons